The 1983 Dallas Cowboys season was the franchise's 24th season in the National Football League. The Cowboys finished second in the NFC East and improving their 6-3 record from 1982. The team broke the record for consecutive playoff appearances with 9 (the 2010 Colts later tied the record).

Summary
The team started the season with seven straight victories, including a memorable Monday night win over the Washington Redskins in which the team erased a 20-point halftime deficit and prevailed, 31–30. The Cowboys were particularly strong on offense, led by quarterback Danny White and running back Tony Dorsett. The Cowboys scored a team record 479 points and staged a few come-from-behind victories during the season. However, the defense gave up many points, despite strong play from Randy White, Ed "Too Tall" Jones, and Everson Walls. In particular, the young secondary was guilty of giving up many big plays throughout the season.

Late in the season, the Cowboys met the Redskins at Texas Stadium with the NFC East crown up for grabs. Both teams entered the game with 12–2 records, but the defending champion Redskins proved too much for the Cowboys and emerged with a 31–10 victory, giving them the NFC East title. With the Cowboys trailing 14–10 in the third quarter, the Cowboys failed on a fourth and one at midfield. The play was a key turning point. There appeared to be a miscommunication between quarterback Danny White and Tom Landry as to whether to run the play. The failed play led to a rare emotional outburst from Landry as he yelled "No, Danny, no." After a 42–17 drubbing at the hands of the San Francisco 49ers the following week, the Cowboys faced the Los Angeles Rams in the wild card game of the NFC playoffs. Despite having the home field advantage, the Cowboys fell, 24–17.

NFL Draft

Undrafted free agents

Roster

Schedule

Division opponents are in bold text

The October 16 and November 6 games against the Philadelphia Eagles were played with locations switched from the original schedule, because of October 16 conflict with game 5 of the baseball World Series.

Season summary

Week 1

Week 2

Week 3

Week 4

Week 5

Week 6

Week 7

Week 8

Week 9

Week 10

Week 11

Week 12

Week 13

Week 14

Week 15

Week 16

Wild card playoffs

December 26, 1983

NFC: Los Angeles Rams 24, Dallas Cowboys 17

Standings

Playoffs

Awards
Five players represented the Cowboys in the 1984 Pro Bowl: Doug Cosbie, Tony Dorsett, Ed "Too Tall" Jones, Everson Walls, and Randy White. White and Walls were voted to the Associated Press' All-NFL  first team, while Dorsett was voted to the AP's All-NFL second team.

Publications
The Football Encyclopedia 
Total Football 
Cowboys Have Always Been My Heroes

References

External links
 1983 Dallas Cowboys
 Pro Football Hall of Fame
 Dallas Cowboys Official Site

Dallas Cowboys seasons
Dallas
Dallas